Andrew Joseph Loiselle (born 1966) is a United States Navy rear admiral who has served as the Director of Air Warfare since August 18, 2021. Previously, he was Commander of Carrier Strike Group 4 from June 15, 2020, to May 17, 2021.

Raised in Cranston, Rhode Island, Loiselle graduated from Assumption College in 1988 with a bachelor's degree in mathematics. After completing flight school, he was designated a naval aviator in January 1991. Loiselle later earned an executive Master of Business Administration degree from the Naval Postgraduate School in June 2004. He is also a graduate of the navy's nuclear power school.

References

|-

|-

1966 births
Living people
Place of birth missing (living people)
People from Cranston, Rhode Island
Assumption University (Worcester) alumni
United States Naval Aviators
Recipients of the Air Medal
Naval Postgraduate School alumni
Recipients of the Meritorious Service Medal (United States)
Recipients of the Legion of Merit
United States Navy admirals
Recipients of the Defense Superior Service Medal